Vladimir Tretyakov may refer to:
 Vladimir Tretyakov (mathematician)
 Vladimir Tretyakov (serial killer)